James P. Heath (December 21, 1777 – June 12, 1854) was a United States congressman from Maryland.

Biography

Early life
Heath was born in Delaware.  He served in the Regular Army as lieutenant of Engineers from 1799 to 1802, as register in chancery in Annapolis, Maryland, and served throughout the War of 1812 as aide-de-camp to General Levin Winder.

Political life
He was elected as a Jacksonian to the Twenty-third Congress, where he served from March 4, 1833, to March 3, 1835.  He was an unsuccessful candidate for reelection in 1834 to the Twenty-fourth Congress.

Death
He died in Georgetown, Washington, D.C., and is interred in Oak Hill Cemetery in Georgetown.

References

1777 births
1854 deaths
Burials at Oak Hill Cemetery (Washington, D.C.)
Jacksonian members of the United States House of Representatives from Maryland
19th-century American politicians